Jakub Otruba (born 30 January 1998) is a Czech racing cyclist, who currently rides for UCI Continental team .

Major results

2015
 National Junior Road Championships
1st  Time trial
2nd Road race
2016
 National Junior Road Championships
1st  Road race 
2nd Time trial
 8th Time trial, UEC European Junior Road Championships
2018
 National Under-23 Road Championships
1st  Road race
1st  Time trial
 3rd Road race, National Road Championships
 4th Time trial, UEC European Under-23 Road Championships
2019
 1st  Time trial, National Under-23 Road Championships
 7th Overall Czech Cycling Tour
1st  Young rider classification
 8th Time trial, European Games
 8th Time trial, UEC European Under-23 Road Championships
2020
 1st  Time trial, National Under-23 Road Championships
 6th Overall Czech Cycling Tour
1st  Young rider classification
 9th Time trial, UEC European Under-23 Road Championships
 9th Overall Okolo Slovenska
2021
 3rd Overall Alpes Isère Tour
 4th Time trial, National Road Championships
 5th Overall Circuit des Ardennes
 5th GP Czech Republic
 7th Overall Tour of Malopolska
 10th Overall Oberösterreichrundfahrt
2022
 3rd Overall Tour of Romania
1st Stage 4
 3rd Time trial, National Road Championships
 3rd Overall Tour of Malopolska
 5th Overall Okolo Slovenska
 10th Overall Alpes Isère Tour
2023
 1st  Overall South Aegean Tour

References

External links
 

1998 births
Living people
Czech male cyclists
Place of birth missing (living people)
European Games competitors for the Czech Republic
Cyclists at the 2019 European Games
Sportspeople from Olomouc